This is a list of Billboard magazine's ranking of the year's top country singles of 1965.

Eddy Arnold had the year's number one single with "What's He Doing in My World". Buck Owens had the number two single with "I've Got a Tiger By the Tail".

See also
List of Hot Country Singles number ones of 1965
List of Billboard Hot 100 number ones of 1965
1965 in country music

Notes

References

1965 record charts
Billboard charts
1965 in American music